Nahle ), is a village situated  northeast of Baalbek in Baalbek District, Baalbek-Hermel Governorate, Lebanon. It has the ruins of a roman temple.

Name
The name "Nahlah" means "honey bee".

History
Nahle was probably founded during Roman rule of the region, that was called in the first century Roman Phoenicia.

The 13th-century geographer Yaqut al-Hamawi listed Nahlah in his geographical dictionary, with its entry being "a village lying 3 miles from Ba'labakk".

In 1838, Eli Smith noted  Nahleh  as a Metawileh village in the Baalbek area.

Actually Nahle is located above a deep and very pretty valley. It is noteworthy to pinpoint that the slopes of this village are studded with the familiar burial chambers often found near Roman/Byzantine sites.

Roman temple

There are the ruins of a Roman temple in the village that are included in a group of Temples of the Beqaa Valley. 

The temple foundations are made of gigantic blocks of stone, upon which sit the remains of a podium. The podium has a long inscription written on it that is now almost impossible to read. The huge foundations indicate that there was a huge temple over these foundations during roman centuries.

This sanctuary consisted of two parts: an open air court and a large room with a ceiling where notches for the wooden beam still exist. Only a few courses of stone are still standing, but the temple maintains its dignity despite crowding by modern village residences.

References

Bibliography

External links
Nahleh, Localiban 
Photo of the Nahle Valley on the website of the American University of Beirut
Photo of Nahle temple on the website of the American University of Beirut
Nahle on travelingluck.com
Nahle on Wikimapia
Nahle on lebanon.com
Nahle on middleeast.com
Picture of Nahle temple foundation stones on alblebanon.com
Picture of Nahle temple foundation stones on alblebanon.com

Populated places in Baalbek District
Archaeological sites in Lebanon
Ancient Roman temples
Roman sites in Lebanon
Tourist attractions in Lebanon